This is a list of the major honours won by football clubs in Greece. It lists every club to have won any of the domestic and international trophies.

Honours table

See also
 Football records and statistics in Greece

External links
Rec.Sport.Soccer Statistics Foundation

Greece by honours
 
clubs by honour